Namakkal is a special grade municipality and the headquarters of Namakkal district in the Indian state of Tamil Nadu. It is the first ISO 14001-2004 certified municipality in Asia for environmental management, specifically the provision and maintenance of water supply, solid waste and sewage management, town planning, lighting and other social services. Namakkal is known as the Egg City due to its large egg production and Transport city.

History
Namakkal is a historic town with references back to at least the 7th century. The name Namakkal derives from Namagiri, which is the name of the single rock formation at the center of the town. The rock is enormous - 65 meters high and more than a kilometre in circumference. Over this massive rock, is a fort, Namakkal Fort.  Kongu nadu a small kingdom who ruled Namakkal during the 16th century. During Sangam age, Namakkal region formed a part of the historical Kongu Nadu region ruled by Cheras  It is believed that Tippu Sultan hid himself in this fort for some time to escape the British. The fort was not built by Tippu Sultan but he occupied it for a brief period of time. Later the fort was captured by British. The front side of the hill is called Thiru. Vi. Ka. Paarai and today is used by taxis as their stand. 
Namakkal is a part of Kongu Nadu which was hotly contested and coveted by both the ancient Pallavas and the Pandyas. Namakkal was in the hands of Atiakula King called Gunasila who had an alliance with Pallava King through marriage. Later the taluk was overrun by the Cholas in the Mandalam. After the struggle between the Cheras, Cholas and Pandiyan, the Hoysalas rose to power and had control till the 14th century followed by the Vijayanagara Kings until 1565 AD. Then the Telugu Madurai Nayaks came to power in 1623 AD. Two of the polygons of Thirumalai Nayak, namely, Ramachandra Nayaka and Gatti Mudaliars, ruled the Salem area. The Namakkal Fort is reported to have been built by Ramachandra Nayakas. After about 1625 AD, the area successively came successively under the rule of Muslim Sultans of Bijapur and Golkonda, Mysore kings and then the Marathas.

Hyder Ali came to power in about the year 1750 AD. During this period, it was a history of power struggle between Hyder Ali and later Tippu, with the British. Namakkal was held by Killdhar (Caption) of Hyder Ali until it was captured by British in 1768. For a brief period during late 18th and early 19th century Namakkal was under Tiruchirappalli district of British Rule. Later, Namakkal was transferred back to Salem District. Then at 01-01-1997 finally announced as a separate district from Salem District.

Two cave temples at Namakkal were called as Adiyendra Visnugrha (Ranganatha swamy Temple) and Adiyanavaya Visnugrha (Narasimha swamy Temple). These Rock cut shrines were built by King Gunaseela of Adhiyaman clan descendant. Because of his marriage relations with the Pallavas, the temples were built of Pallava Architectural style during the 7th century. Generally, Namakkal is considered a Vaishnava kshetram, and there is no Shiva temple in the town until a few years ago.

Mahatma Gandhi held a public meeting in 1933 in Namakkal under the slope of the Namakkal rock.

Demographics

According to 2011 census, Namakkal had a population of 55,145 with a sex-ratio of 1,015 females for every 1,000 males, much above the national average of 929. A total of 5,002 were under the age of six, constituting 2,609 males and 2,393 females. Scheduled Castes and Scheduled Tribes accounted for 13.7% and .5% of the population respectively. The average literacy of the town was 82.52%, compared to the national average of 72.99%. The town had a total of 15008 households. There were a total of 21,572 workers, comprising 133 cultivators, 264 main agricultural labourers, 562 in house hold industries, 19,646 other workers, 967 marginal workers, 22 marginal cultivators, 24 marginal agricultural labourers, 151 marginal workers in household industries and 770 other marginal workers. As per the religious census of 2011, Namakkal had 88.98% Hindus, 9.29% Muslims, 1.48% Christians, 0.01% Sikhs, 0.0% Buddhists, 0.01% Jains, 0.23% following other religions and 0.01% following no religion or did not indicate any religious preference.

Tourism

Namakkal Anjaneyar temple
Namakkal Anjaneyar temple is located in Namakkal, and is dedicated to the Hindu god Hanuman. It is constructed in the Dravidian style of architecture. The image of Anjaneyar is carved out of a single stone and is existing from the 5th century. There is no roof over the sanctum and Anjaneyar has a unique iconography sporting a sword in his waist and holding a garland made of saligrama. The temple is considered one of the prominent temples in the Tamil Nadu state and the country. The Agamam is followed by "Sri Vaikhanasam".

Namagiri Lakshmi Narasimar swami temple

Namagiri Lakshmi Narasimhaswami Temple of Lord Vishnu has the form of Sri Narasimha Swami. The temple is believed to be built during the 8th century by the Pandya kings in Rock-cut architecture. The temple does not find a mention in Naalayira Divya Prabhandams, and thus is not listed in Divya desam series of 108 temples.

Annual car festival for the Lord Narasimmaswamy temple is celebrated in March and April every year (Tamil Month "Panguni") as per "Sri Vaikhanasa Ahamam".

Namakkal Fort
Namakkal Fort is a historic fort present in Namakkal in Namakkal district in the South Indian state of Tamil Nadu. The rock fort is on the summit of the rock, and the remnants in brick and stone still bear the brunt of the skirmishes to lay siege to the fort by the Cholas in the 9th century. The fort was reinforced during the reign of kongu Vellalars in the 17th century. There is a temple and a mosque that are located within the fort, both of which are tourist attractions of the town. In modern times, the fort is under the control of the Archaeological Department of the Government of Tamil Nadu.

The Ranganathaswamy temple is another rock-cut temple alongside the fort. Ranganathaswamy cave temple is believed to have been built by the Pallavas.

Transport

Road
Buses ply to cities in Tamil Nadu like Salem, Erode, Trichy, Karur, Coimbatore, Chennai, Madurai and Dindigul. Namakkal is connected to the rest of India through National Highway 44 Buses from Trichy or Madurai will pass through Namakkal to reach Salem or Bangalore.

Railway
A new broad-gauge railway line from Salem to Karur via Namakkal started its service on 25 May 2013. There are trains daily from/to Salem, Karur, Chennai Central, Bangalore,  Dindigul, Palani, Madurai, Tirunelveli, Nagercoil, Pollachi and Palakkad.

Salem Jn to Karur Jn

Rasipuram railway station 
Puduchatram railway station
Kalangani railway station 
Namakkal railway station
Laddivadi railway station
Mohanur railway station

Salem Jn to Erode Jn
 
Anangur railway station
Cauvery railway station

Airports
The nearest airports are Salem Airport (52 km), Coimbatore International Airport (153 km), and Trichy International airport (85 km). Salem Airport started from 15 November 2009.

Geography
It is close to Kolli Hills – which are part of the Eastern Ghats.

Tourism in the district of Namakkal is based on the temples namely Namakkal anjaneyar temple and Namagiri amman temple of the area. It is eighteen miles or twenty eight kilometers long (from north to south), twelve miles or nineteen kilometers wide (from east to west) and the Koll block is spread over an area of 441.4 square kilometers. When viewed from the plains of the Namakkal district, the mountain looks like a flat-topped mass. The mountain has been inhabited from prehistoric times. It is much celebrated in the Tamil Literature of the Sangam Age and at least eleven poets describe about it in their poems. A Shiva Temple, known as the Arappalleeswarar Temple, dates back to twelfth century and is located at Periakoviloor near the waterfalls called Akasa Gangai. An ancient and powerful deity called Kolli Paavai of Ettukkai Amman is also at the Kolli Hills. It attracts large pilgrims and was originally a Jain retreat.

Climate
Namakkal has a tropical savanna climate (Köppen Aw) with a wet season from May to October, a relatively mild “cool” season from November to February, and a sweltering “hot” season in March and April.

Platinum
Platinum deposit found in Sithampoondi village near Namakkal. Total deposit 0.7 ton.

Politics
Namakkal assembly constituency is part of Namakkal (Lok Sabha constituency). A.K.P.Chinraj serves as M.P. for Namakkal Constituency. 
P.Ramalingam serves as M.L.A. for Namakkal.

Gallery

See also
Kalangani
Sendamangalam
Vettambadi
Jedarpalayam
Kolli Hills

References

 
Articles containing potentially dated statements from 2001
All articles containing potentially dated statements
Cities and towns in Namakkal district